The World Day for Cultural Diversity for Dialogue and Development is a United Nations–sanctioned international holiday for the promotion of diversity and dialogue issues. It is currently celebrated on May 21.  The United Nations General Assembly proclaimed this holiday due to UNESCO's Universal Declaration on Cultural Diversity in November 2001.  It was proclaimed by UN Resolution 57/249.

Diversity Day, officially known as "The World Day for Cultural Diversity for Dialogue and Development", is an opportunity to help communities understand the value of cultural diversity and learn how to live together in harmony.  This day was created as a result of the destruction of the Buddha statues of Bamiyan in Afghanistan in 2001.

References

57 249
May observances
2001 in the United Nations